HCA Florida Kendall Hospital (formerly Kendall Regional Medical Center) is a for-profit, tertiary care, 447-bed teaching hospital located in the Miami neighborhood of Kendall. HCA Healthcare owns and operates the hospital.

HCA Florida Kendall Hospital is a teaching hospital that serves as the primary training location for several residency and fellowship programs. It currently hosts accredited residencies in the fields of anesthesia, emergency medicine, general surgery, internal medicine, and podiatry. It also hosts a fellowship in surgical critical care. HCA Florida Kendall Hospital is also involved in the training of medical students, and students training in other medical professions. It is affiliated with the Florida International University Herbert Wertheim College of Medicine and the University of South Florida College of Medicine, as well as accepting visiting medical students.

History 
The hospital was originally founded in 1973. In May 2016, the hospital's trauma center designation was upgraded from a Level II trauma center to a Level I trauma center.

Services 
HCA Florida Kendall Hospital is a Level I trauma center, a comprehensive stroke center, an accredited chest pain center with PCI, and a regional comprehensive burn center. The hospital also features a labor and delivery unit and a Level III neonatal intensive care unit.

References 

Teaching hospitals in Florida
Trauma centers
Buildings and structures in Miami
Hospitals established in 1973
HCA Healthcare